The Former Singapore Badminton Hall (Abbreviation: SBH), formerly Singapore Badminton Stadium, is a former indoor sports hall for badminton located on Guillemard Road in Geylang, Singapore.

The old facility was previously situated at 100 Guillemard Road. The hall's nearby building (102 Guillemard Road) was formerly the headquarters of the Singapore Badminton Association (SBA). Both buildings were refurnished in May 2009 as the commercial centre Guillemard Village.

The current Singapore Badminton Hall is located at 1 Lorong 23 Geylang.

History

Construction
The original Singapore Badminton Stadium was built in 1952 for the Thomas Cup Tournament. The first tournament was held in the UK in 1949, and the Malayan team won the championship. As a result, Malaya also won the right to host the next Thomas Cup, that was scheduled for 1952. As there was no suitable indoor sports hall in Malaya then, the Singapore Badminton Association (SBA) decided to build one in Singapore. A fund to build the badminton hall was launched, after a ceremony welcoming the victorious Thomas Cup team at the Victoria Memorial Hall.

In February 1951, SBA requested from the Singapore Government a plot of land at Guillemard Road to build the badminton stadium. SBA was granted a 99-year lease on the land, effectively from 1 July the same year, and proceeded to construct the sports hall.

The estimated construction cost for the hall was S$200,000 to S$250,000 but the eventual cost rose to S$800,000. Donations then totalled only S$32,000. Aw Boon Haw, who was a patron of the SBA, gave a loan of S$250,000. Despite this, funds were still short by over S$400,000. Nevertheless, the Badminton Hall Management Committee, headed by Tan Ark Sye, pressed ahead with the construction of the hall. The main contractor was C. H. Tong.

The Singapore Badminton Stadium was completed in May 1952. However, the SBA did not have sufficient funds to cover the total construction cost. Eventually, the hall was relinquished to the Singapore Sports Council which took over its management in 1978.

Thomas Cup

Although it was completed in May 1952, the Singapore Badminton Stadium was not ready for the 2nd Thomas Cup Tournament that was scheduled on 27–28 May that year. The tournament was held at the Happy World Stadium, where the Malayan Team, which included Wong Peng Soon, Ong Poh Lim and Ismail Marjan, successfully defended their title.

On 7 June 1952, the Singapore Badminton Stadium was officially opened by the Governor of Singapore, Sir John Fearns Nicoll.

In 1955, the 3rd Thomas Cup Tournament was held at the Singapore Badminton Hall for the first time. The Malayan Team won its 3rd consecutive title. The 4th Thomas Cup Tournament was also held at the badminton hall in June 1958 but the  Indonesian team won this time.

Political events

In June 1959, a crowd of nearly 7,000 workers from 63 trade unions gathered at the Singapore Badminton Stadium to celebrate the advent of the new government after the general election, which was won by the People's Action Party.

On 1 September 1962, the Singapore Badminton Stadium was the vote counting station for a referendum to Tunku Abdul Rahman's suggestion to merge Singapore, Brunei, Sarawak, Sabah and the Federation of Malaya to form Malaysia. About 71 percent of the electorate voted for the merger proposal. At 11.15am on 3 September, Prime Minister Lee Kuan Yew speaks of 'the clear and decisive verdict' of the people of Singapore for merger with Malaysia, and 'the awful moment of truth' for the Communists. This speech came immediately after the announcement of the Government's victory over the Barisan Socialis-led call to cast blank votes in the referendum. (See: Singaporean national referendum, 1962)

Concerts
On 7 December 1959, the Singapore Badminton Stadium was the venue of Radio Singapore's all-star variety show, Puspawarna Singapura, which was hosted by P. Ramlee.

In February 1965, the British rock group The Rolling Stones held a one-night performance at the Singapore Badminton Stadium. The crowd was so excited that a wall erected for the concert collapsed.

Southeast Asian Games
On 1 February 1978, the Singapore Sports Council took over the management of the Singapore Badminton Stadium after acquiring a 30-year lease from the Lands Office (now the Singapore Land Authority). The hall was then renovated and renamed as the Singapore Badminton Hall and served as the venue for badminton in the 12th and 17th Southeast Asian Games, hosted by Singapore in 1983 and 1993 respectively.

Chronicles (1930s – 2013) 
Badminton sports for Singapore (since 1930s)

This recreational sport was first introduced to Singapore during the time of the British Colony. The game, at the beginning, was essentially played within the circle of the affluent British residents in Singapore. Then in the 1930s, the badminton sport gained its popularity among the local population but mainly the upper social class such as the white collar workforce, the social elites from English speaking background. Students from Chinese education played it as well, but badminton might seem to be less widespread for the Chinese-educated who were usually less wealthy as compared to the English-educated. Nonetheless, the sport's wide acceptance certainly had to do with the ease at which how the preparation of the game was made—a minimum of only two players are needed and the court can be anywhere where the ground is flat and the place without wind

The increasing passion for the sports had led to many badminton clubs formed among the local players be it professional or amateur. This was when the Singapore Badminton Association (SBA) was founded in 1929. The association, supported by patrons such as Tan Chin Tuan (director of the OCBC bank) and Song Ong Siang (an influential figure of the Straits Chinese community), aimed to encourage the game and to select the excellent players from various clubs by organising games among the clubs, so as to produce local athletes to participate in the renowned tournaments among the international community.

After World War II, despite of the negative impact on the badminton fever due to the war, local badminton players started to shine in the international stage where the Malayan team won their first championship in the Thomas Cup in 1949.

Construction of The Singapore Badminton Stadium (1949–1952)

The winning in 1949 allowed Malaya, particularly the SBA (a sub-association of Malayan Badminton Association, to hold the next Thomas Cup Championship at its place since the winners were from Singapore. However, the sports halls available at that time were considered unsuitable for hosting any international tournaments. The President of SBA at that time, Lim Chuan Geok, thus made call for constructing new badminton hall. The construction cost was planned to be funded through public fundraising.

The fundraising was later found to be challenging when the government revealed its plan to construct another stadium at the same time, misleading many to think that the new badminton hall was thus replaced. The diminishing amount of public donations together with the increasing cost of construction hindered the progress of the whole project. A sponsor of SBA, Aw Boon Haw (founder of "Tiger Balm"), donated a huge sum of money to finance the project. The deficit was ultimately absorbed by the building contractor of the hall, C. H. Tong. However, SBA was rendered in debt by the project.

The entire construction was finished in 1952. The Stadium was built to accommodate changing rooms, canteens, offices, 4 badminton courts and 5500 seats[11]. Ironically, the hall dedicated for the Thomas Cup ended up not being used for the incoming Championship because it was thought to be a gamble to let the Malayan team to perform in a hall environment to which they might not become acclimatised yet. The Thomas Cup was held in Happy World Stadium in 1952 instead.

1955

The hall had its first time hosting the Thomas Cup Championship which was also the third-time tournament. Again, the Malayan team succeeded in defending their champion title.

1958

The fourth Thomas Cup Championship was, too, held in the Singapore Badminton Stadium, but this time round, the Malayan team was defeated by Indonesian team.

1959-1960

The year 1959 saw mostly the non-sporting events taking place in the Stadium.  The People's Action Party (PAP) had made public speech to celebrate their victory in the general election. The Hall also served to hold entertainment activities such as dramas, dances and even erotic strip dance by the famous local "Strip Dancing Queen" Rose Chan. In addition, from 1959 to 1960, Puspawarna Singapura, live recordings of variety shows were held by the Radio Singapore with P. Ramlee (famous Malaysian singer, producer, composer) as the main host. It could be seen that the usage of the sports hall was less strict and exclusive. It might be out of an urge for SBA to increase its source of income and to clear off its debt from the construction.

1962

In 1962, the Stadium was used as a counting station for the voting over matter of Malaya-Singapore merger where the People's Action Party had a clear-cut victory. The political significance of the Stadium was clear enough—the hall was a key connection spot between the ruling party and its supporters. On the other hand, during the times of trade union riots, the hall acted as a gathering spot for the unions. Such preference possibly reflected the existence of hall more than just a building but a essential space where political activities or social movements from the working class could be made widely known to the rest of the society.

1965

A British rock band, The Rolling Stones, conducted their one-stop performance at the badminton stadium. The over-excited spectators resulted in the collapse of a wall.

1978

Due to SBA's inability to pay off the debt from construction, the Stadium as well as the remaining debt was taken over by the Singapore Sports Council. Upon acquiring the stadium, it was refurbished and renamed as the Singapore Badminton Hall. The Hall was assigned to be the one of the event venues for the Southeast Asian Games, which had its 12th (Year 1983) and 17th (Year 1993) games hosted in the Hall.

1983

12th Southeast Asian Game badminton tournament was hosted in the Hall.

1986

A tenant, the Fatty Weng restaurant, was opened at the Singapore Badminton Hall in 1986.

1993

17th Southeast Asian Game badminton tournament was held.

1999

The Old Singapore Badminton Hall was declared a historical site by the National Heritage Board to acknowledge its historical significance in 2 major events—the 2 times hosting of Thomas Cup Champions and the vote-counting for 1962 Malaya-Singapore Merger Referendum.

2011

Onsight Climbing Gym, the biggest indoor climbing gym in Singapore occupied the Old Badminton Hall.

2012

GymKraft, the biggest gymnastics gym in Singapore occupied the Old Badminton Hall.

Architectural features

Style

The Old Singapore Badminton Hall appeared to be heavily influenced by the concrete brutalism though quite a portion of its building was made of metal. The façade at the main entrance has huge sun-breakers as its aesthetic component. The brutalist style here is less prominent as opposed to the other modernist brutalist architectures because most of the Hall's façades have been covered by coloured paints to lighten the tone of the concrete.

Form

The form is a resultant geometry of a terraced pitched roof sitting on top of a rectangular mass. The design approach is relatively simple: a rectangular space accommodates all the programs and a roof to covers the upward opening, while the sun-breakers and openings are made on the façades to reduce heat and increase ventilation in the tropical climate. It could be evident that aesthetics was more or less a secondary consideration for the design and the methodology employed was very functionalistic.

Roof

The roof of the hall, like many others at its time, was made of zinc with metallic truss system supported below, imposing a sense of lightness to the overall outlook of the building and reducing its seemingly bulky existence. However, zinc material is considered a poor thermal mass and might adversely affect the indoor climate. That could be the reason why the SBA did not use the Hall for the 2nd Thomas Cup tournament.

Structural Support

The weight of the roof was spread out in 2 opposite directions and to the 2 facades, and hence it can be deduced that the main entrance façade and the back facade are the load-bearing walls. In the indoor space, the structural elements are the metal trusses as well as the metal frame pillars located at the 2 sides of the hall, freeing up the space in the center.

Natural Lighting and Ventilation

Most of the openings are positioned at the higher portion of the façades to accommodate natural light and wind into the indoor space without causing strong glares and letting the rains come in. Yet the design ventilation is likely to be ineffective as seemed from the installation of electric fans within the space.

The Present and The Past (streetscape)

The front entrance of the Hall used to be an ideal spot for gathering due to the vast open space and less traffic flow in the past. Along with the Hall's fame for hosting various major sports, political and entertainment events, it probably became highly sorted after when it comes to choosing a place to publicise other events. Moving on to the present day, the road space is no longer humanized due to the amount of traffic flow and the greenery space further reduces the size of open area for the Hall. The Hall is now less monumental than it once was.

Historical site 
On 1 September 1999, the Singapore Badminton Hall was marked by the National Heritage Board as a historical site. This was in recognition of the two significant historical events that happened at the hall—it held two Thomas Cup tournaments and was the vote counting station for the landmark 1962 referendum. The ceremony was officiated by Abdullah Tarmugi, Minister for Community Development and Sports.

Redevelopment
The building's another tenant, the Fatty Weng restaurant which was opened in 1986, moved to Smith Street in Chinatown in March 2007 when the SBA was not able to commit to a long-term contract.

In July 2007, the Singapore Badminton Association announced plans to close the Singapore Badminton Hall, after the 30-year lease between the Singapore Sports Council and the Urban Redevelopment Authority ceases on 31 January 2008. The SBA's lease is for the badminton hall and its adjacent building, which houses the association's office and practice courts. Its current annual lease of under S$100,000 would be increased to S$1.164 million if the SBA were to renew it, but the association has no plans to do so. The SBA cited possible sites for its new temporary headquarters at the Singapore Sports School and Anglo-Chinese School (Independent). The SBA will eventually be relocated to the Singapore Sports Hub in Kallang, due for completion in 2011.

When the Singapore Badminton Hall closes, the building was returned to the URA. The site of the hall has been zoned for sports and recreation use under URA's Master Plan 2003.

In January 2008, the SBA headquarters and Singapore Badminton Hall was officially closed down after the land lease contract ended and the Singapore Sports Council decided not to renew it given the rising price of the new lease. The Hall was then returned to the Urban Redevelopment Authority (URA).

In May 2009, after a S$2-million refurbishment, the former Singapore Badminton Association building and the former Singapore Badminton Hall started its operation as Guillemard Village under the development by the Turf City Management. The site was re-developed as a centre for food and beverage as well as leisure. The Hall was deliberately refurbished to give retain the essence of the past, hopefully reminding people of the Gay World.

In November 2009, a 24-hour prawn fishing restaurant known as Geylang Prawn Fishing Restaurant was opened, which occupied half of the former sports hall. In August 2011, The restaurant was closed at the hall upon its lease ended and moved to Punggol East Golf Club.

Currently as of 2013, the most well-known occupants of the Hall are the Brawn & Brains Cafe and the Onsight Climbing Gym.

Nowadays, there are various badminton lessons, such as kids badminton lessons, adult badminton lessons, conducted in the new Singapore badminton hall which play an important role to keep Singaporean healthy.

See also
 Sport in Singapore

References

Other

External links
Singapore Government eCitizen website
Singapore Badminton Association

Sports venues completed in 1952
Indoor arenas in Singapore
Badminton in Singapore
Geylang
Badminton venues
1952 establishments in Singapore
20th-century architecture in Singapore